Statistics of Czechoslovak First League in the 1964–65 season.

Overview
It was contested by 14 teams, and Sparta Prague won the championship. Pavol Bencz was the league's top scorer with 21 goals.

Stadia and locations

League standings

Results

Top goalscorers

References

Czechoslovakia - List of final tables (RSSSF)

Czechoslovak First League seasons
Czech
1964–65 in Czechoslovak football